Hugo Baar (3 March 1873, Nový Jičín – 18 June 1912, Munich) was a Moravian-German landscape painter.

Biography 
His father was a merchant. After attending a German gymnasium, he learned weaving at a local arts and crafts school from 1889 to 1892. Later, he was able to enroll at the Academy of Fine Arts, Vienna, where he studied with the landscape painter, Rudolf Ribarz, and the Academy of Fine Arts, Munich, where his primary instructors were Gabriel von Hackl and Heinrich Knirr.

In 1903, he married the daughter of a hat factory manager and had his first showing in Vienna, where he participated in an exhibition staged by the Hagenbund and became a member of that group. The following year, he had a solo exhibition in Olomouc, near his birthplace. After resettling there, he made the acquaintance of Bohumír Jaroněk, a member of the "Association of Moravian Artists" (SVUM) who enabled him to exhibit with that organization. In 1907, he was one of the founding members of the local Museum Association.

He also exhibited in Brno with the "Mährischer Kunstverein", the German equivalent of the SVUM. At this time, he came under the influence of Gustav Klimt and was associated with the Vienna Secession. Later he helped establish the "Association of German-Moravian Visual Artists" in Brno and became its Vice-Chairman. The Chairman was Hugo Charlemont, but Baar organized all of the group's activities.

In 1910, he travelled extensively throughout Germany, Belgium and the Netherlands. He died suddenly in 1912, while working on a contract for lithographs, in Munich.

Selected paintings

References

Further reading 
 Eva Trnková, Hugo Baar: Obrazy (exhibition catalog), Muzeum Novojičínska, 1993

External links 

ArtNet: More works by Baar.
Hugo Baar @ abART

1873 births
1912 deaths
People from Nový Jičín
People from the Margraviate of Moravia
Moravian-German people
Austrian landscape painters
19th-century Austrian painters
19th-century Austrian male artists
Members of the Vienna Secession
Academy of Fine Arts Vienna alumni
Austro-Hungarian painters
Austro-Hungarian emigrants to Germany